Flaka Krelani (born 28 June 1989) is an Kosovo-Albanian singer.

Music career
Flaka started her career at "Ethet", a similar contest to Idols where she reached the final. After the show, she became one of the most popular Albanian rock singers.
During the six-year period after Ethet, Flaka participated in various music festivals held in different Albanian territories. She participated in Top Fest, receiving "Best Alternative" in its 4th edition, and "Best Rock" in its eighth edition.

She has tried to represent Albania in Eurovision four times. In 2008, she ranked second, and Top 5 in the two upcoming years. In 2015 she ranked third with her song "S’je Për Mu"

Discography

Albums
Xperimental (2016)

Singles
A Ka Kuptim - Flaka Krelani
Am I Good Man - Flaka Krelani
E Di - Flaka Krelani
Edhe Sa - Flaka Krelani
Enderr - Flaka Krelani
Fire - Flaka Krelani
Funky Funk - Flaka Krelani
Hit Me - Flaka Krelani
Intro Xperimental - Flaka Krelani
Jan Qu Fjalt E Urta Pesh - Flaka Krelani
Jeta Kerkon Dashuri - Flaka Krelani & Doruntina Disha
Krej C'ka Ke S'je - Flaka Krelani
Le Te Behet çfare Te Doje - Flaka Krelani
Nata - Flaka Krelani
Ngrihu Tash - Flaka Krelani
Nje Bote Tjeter - Flaka Krelani
Nuk Mundem - Arber Elezi & Flaka Krelani
Pa Titull - Flaka Krelani
Për Ty - Erti Hizmo & Flaka Krelani
Relax - Flaka Krelani
S'je Për Mu - Flaka Krelani
Shpirti - Flaka Krelani
T'Boj me Rock - Flaka Krelani
Tek Ti Ne Shpirt (Labirinti I Zemres) - Flaka Krelani
Ti - Flaka Krelani
Un - Flaka Krelani
Zjarm - Flaka Krelani
Frie - Flaka Krelani
Rebelohem - Flaka Krelani
Osiris - Flaka Krelani
Collaboration:
Troja - Beautiful World  (Feat. Flaka Krelani)
Kengetare Te Ndryshem - Prane Njeri Tjetrit 
Artistet E Gjakoves - Qyteti I Humbur 
Rina Abdyli - Si Bass  (Feat. Flaka Krelani & Mc Kresh

Awards and nominations

Festivali i Këngës

|-
||2007
||"Jeta kerkon dashuri"
|Main Competition
|
|-
||2015
||"S'je per mu"
|Main Competition
|
|}

Kenga Magjike

|-
||2016
||"Rebelohem"
|Best Female Vocal 
|
|}

Top Fest

|-
||2007 
||"Nje bote tjeter"
|Best Alternative
|
|-
||2011
||"Krej C'ka Ke Sje"
|Best Rock & Alternative Song
|
|}

Netet e Klipit Shqiptare

|-
||2015
||"Zjam"
|Best Rock Video
|
|}

Videofest Awards

|-
|rowspan="2"|2007
|rowspan="2"|"Nje bote tjeter"
|Best Rock Video
|
|-
|Best Editing
|
|-
||2008
||"T'boj me Rock"
|Best Rock Video 
|
|}

Zhurma Show Awards

|-
||2015
||"Am I Good Man"
|Best Rock
|
|}

References

21st-century Albanian women singers
Kosovan singers
Kosovo Albanians
Living people
1989 births
Musicians from Gjakova
Festivali i Këngës contestants